Moldavians or Moldavian may refer to:

 Moldavians, residents of the medieval Principality of Moldavia (14th century to 1859), currently divided between Romania, Moldova and Ukraine
 Moldavians, residents of the historical region of Moldavia, specially of Western Moldavia
 Moldovans, residents of Moldova, a country in Eastern Europe

See also
 Moldovan (disambiguation)